Ychoux is a commune in the Landes department, New Aquitaine, southwestern France.

Population

See also
Communes of the Landes department

References

Communes of Landes (department)